Lemuel Cambridge Owen (November 1, 1822 – November 26, 1912) was a Prince Edward Island shipbuilder, banker, merchant and politician, the second premier of Prince Edward Island.

He was born in Charlottetown to Thomas Owen, who was Postmaster General for Prince Edward Island for eighteen years, serving until his death in 1860. Owen was educated in private schools and at the Central Academy in Charlottetown (later Prince of Wales College).

One of the island's most successful businessmen, Owen succeeded his father as Postmaster General of the island in 1860 before entering politics in 1866 winning election as a Conservative. Owen became Premier of the province in 1873 after James Colledge Pope entered federal politics. Owen was the second premier since PEI joined Canadian confederation on July 1, 1873. His government set up a Land Commission that was responsible for using funds provided by the federal government to implement land reform and end the island's system of proprietary land ownership and tenant farming.

His government was unable to resolve the contentious schools question that divided both the Conservative and Liberal parties along sectarian lines and his government was replaced in 1876 by a Protestant coalition formed to implement a secular school system on the island. Owen retired from politics and returned to his business interests.

Owen had married Lois Welsh in 1861. He retired from business in 1892 and died at the home of one of his sons in Charlottetown in 1912.

External links 
Biography at the Dictionary of Canadian Biography Online
The Canadian parliamentary companion for 1876 HJ Morgan

1822 births
1912 deaths
People from Charlottetown
Canadian Anglicans
Premiers of Prince Edward Island
Progressive Conservative Party of Prince Edward Island MLAs
Progressive Conservative Party of Prince Edward Island leaders
Prince of Wales College alumni